Roland C. Daniels (November 30, 1950 – September 6, 1988) was an American professional wrestler, better known by his ring name, Leroy Brown. He took his ring name from the Jim Croce song about "Bad, Bad" Leroy Brown, which also became his theme song for a lot of his in ring appearances. He later used the ringname Elijah Akeem as he adopted a more militaristic black Muslim character, teaming with Kareem Muhammad as the Muslim Connection and later the Zambuie Express.

Brown started out his career working as a face in the south, portraying a simple, honest man who always backed up his friends. He later portrayed a heel, acting like an arrogant, rich, self-obsessed character. During his career he won a number of singles championships such as NWA Southern Heavyweight Championship and the NWA Mid-Atlantic Television Championship as well as a number of tag team championships, teaming with Muhammad to win the NWA Florida Global Tag Team Championship, NWA United States Tag Team Championship and AWA Southern Tag Team Championships.

Professional wrestling career
Daniels made his professional wrestling debut in 1977, adopting the ring name "Bad Bad" Leroy Brown, based on the Jim Croce song of the same name. In September, 1977 he took part in a tournament for the vacant NWA Southern Heavyweight Championship, his first major title opportunity, but he was eliminated in the early rounds. Next he traveled to Texas to work for Fritz Von Erich's NWA Big Time Wrestling. On March 31, 1978, Brown and Killer Tim Brooks teamed up to defeat José Lothario and Al Madril to win the NWA Texas Tag Team Championship, Brown's first championship. The reign only lasted a week before Brown and Brooks lost the championship to David and Kevin Von Erich.

By 1979 Leroy Brown began working in San Francisco for NWA Hollywood. Brown teamed up with Allen Coage and together they defeated Los Guerreros (Héctor and Mando Guerrero) to win the NWA Americas Tag Team Championship. They would later lose the belts to Mando Guerrero and Carlos Mata. Working for NWA Hollywood also allowed Brown to travel to Japan, touring with New Japan Pro-Wrestling (NJPW). During the tour he challenged Seiji Sakaguchi for the NWF North American Heavyweight Championship in July 1979 but Sakaguchi retained the title by disqualification. In his book Animal, George Steele describes Brown's problems in Japan, including how during a match a Japanese wrestler was trying to break a bottle over Brown's head but had not prepared it properly and it took several hard blows to break the bottle. The following day several Japanese wrestlers would watch the tape of the match over and over again, laughing at Brown's misfortune and pain. Back in San Francisco Brown defeated Chavo Guerrero to win the WWA Americas Heavyweight Championship, holding it for 50 days before losing it to Al Madril. In late 1979 Brown returned to the eastern coast, competing for Championship Wrestling from Florida. Initially he became involved in a feud with then NWA Florida Heavyweight Champion, Manny Fernandez facing him on several occasions during January. After that he moved on to facing Sweet Brown Sugar, whom he defeated to win the NWA Southern Heavyweight Championship. He would later lose it to Dusty Rhodes on February 16, 1980, Jacksonville, Florida. By late 1980 Brown ended up working for Bill Watts' Mid-South Wrestling, teaming with Ernie Ladd for most of his time in Mid-South. The two defeated Junkyard Dog and Terry Orndorff to win the Mid-South Tag Team Championship. They later trade the championship with Junkyard Dog and other partners such as Killer Karl Kox and Dick Murdoch.

In 1981 Mid-Atlantic Championship Wrestling (MACW) based in the Carolinas brought Leroy Brown on as a regular worker. They presented him as a blue collar hero, wearing coveralls and a hard hat to the ring. He showed up to help the good guys take on Sgt. Slaughter and his army, backing them up whenever Slaughter's army tried to use the numbers to their advantage. Brown and various partners such as Ricky Steamboat and Sweet Ebony Diamond would challenge The Minnesota Wrecking Crew (Gene and Ole Anderson) for the Mid-Atlantic version of the NWA World Tag Team Championship. In 1982 Leroy Brown became involved in a storyline feud with then NWA World Heavyweight Champion Ric Flair. The storyline started with an arm wrestling challenge laid out by Flair. Brown won the challenge, leading to Flair demand a rematch that Brown also won. During a third arm wrestling challenge Brown was attacked by Big John Studd, beating Brown up prior to a Brown wrestling Flair for the championship at the Omni Coliseum, Georgia Championship Wrestling's venue for major shows. Despite the attack Brown would go on to win the match, but the victory was by disqualification as Flair intentionally got himself disqualified to keep the championship. Subsequently, Flair would frustrate Brown at every turn, using underhanded tactics and placing a bounty of Brown to keep him away from the championship. During the feud Flair would try to tempt Brown with fancy suits and the "jet set" lifestyle, hoping to tempt Brown to side with him. After losing to Flair in June, 1982 Brown shocked his fans when he accepted the offer, turning heel as he became enamored with fine clothes, jewelry and fast cars. Brown took Oliver Humperdink as his manager, becoming part of the heel group "House of Humperdink". On November 27, 1982, Brown won a 20-man battle royal to win the vacant NWA Mid-Atlantic Television Championship. His reign as the TV champion lasted only 28 days, losing the championship on December 25 to Mike Rotunda. Following the loss of the championship Brown left JCP and traveled to Florida.

Zambuie Express/Muslim Connection
In 1983 the Florida bookers came up with a storyline where Daniels announced that he had changed his name to "Eljiah Akeem", referring to it as his Muslim name. He became the bodyguard for the hated heel "Exotic" Adrian Street. A couple of months later he was teamed up with Ray Candy to form the "Zambuie Express", which was at times billed as "The Muslim Connection" in some promotions. Candy took the name "Kareem Muhammad". The duo began to wear camouflage pants and shirts to the ring, adopting militaristic Muslim in ring characters, based to some extent on the Black Panther Party. The two toured mainly in the southern parts of the United States where their racially charged characters made them very hated. The team was often managed by Humperdink and was part of the "House of Humperdink". In Florida the duo defeated Mike Graham and Scott McGhee to win the NWA Florida Global Tag Team Championship on July 31, 1983. The duo held the championship until September of that year, when it was replaced by the Florida version of the NWA United States Tag Team Championship. The Zambuie Express were declared the United States Champions, with the storyline being that they won a tournament. Two months later the Zambuie Express lost the championship to the team of Dusty Rhodes and Blackjack Mulligan on November 5, 1983

From Florida the team traveled to Memphis to compete for the Continental Wrestling Association (CWA) where they were immediately pitted against the top face team of the territory The Fabulous Ones (Stan Lane and Steve Keirn). On January 24, 1984, the Zambuie Express were awarded the AWA Southern Tag Team Championship when the Fabulous Ones failed to show up for a match, but the titles were declared vacant instead of giving them to Akeem and Muhammad. The CWA held a tournament for the vacant championship, a tournament won by the Zambuie Express as they defeated the Pretty Young Things (Koko B. Ware and Norvell Austin) in the final match. The Pretty Young Things won the championship only a week later, defeating the Zambuie Express on CWA's weekly show at the Mid-South Coliseum. Eight days later the Zambuie Express regained the championship. The duo held on to the belts until March 12, 1984, when they lost to Jerry Lawler and Jos LeDuc. The team toured with New Japan Pro-Wrestling in the spring of 1984 and then ended up working for Jim Crockett Promotions based in the Carolinas by the summer of 1984. The team sided with Paul Jones and became part of Paul Jones' Army as they fought against Jimmy Valiant and Valiant's friends. The Express competed on the 1984 version of Starrcade, where they lost to the team of Buzz Tyler and The Masked Assassin #1. The loss to Tyler and the Assassin was one of the last matches the Zambuie Express worked together, splitting up a short time later.

Return to Leroy Brown
In 1985 Daniels resumed working as Leroy Brown, travelling to Japan to work a tour for NJPW, often teaming with "Bad News" Allen Coage. By 1986 Brown began working for the Universal Wrestling Federation (UWF), formerly Mid-South Wrestling. In the UWF teamed up with "Wild" Bill Irwin and won the UWF Tag Team Championship from the team of John Tatum and Jack Victory on November 9, 1986. The team successfully defended the championship against Gary Young and Joe Savoldi as part of the UWF Superdome Extravaganza, held at the New Orleans' Superdome on November 27. The team held the title for 48 days in total, until they were defeated by Terry Taylor and Jim Duggan on December 27, 1986.

Death
Daniels died on September 6, 1988, as the result of a stroke and subsequent heart attack caused by severe cirrhosis at a hospital in Savannah, Georgia at the age of 37.

Other Leroy Browns
Daniels was not the only wrestler to use the ring name "Leroy Brown", Polynesian wrestler Leroy Tuifao also used the name "Leroy Brown" as he wrestled primarily in Hawaii. British wrestler Oliver Biney, better known as Rampage Brown, also used the name "Leroy Brown" for a period of time. The Junkyard Dog originally wrestled under the name "Leroy Rochester", which has led some sources to mistakenly list Roland Daniels' birth name as "Leroy Rochester". In addition, Allen Coage wrestled under the name "Bad News Brown".

Championships and accomplishments 
Championship Wrestling from Florida
NWA Florida Global Tag Team Championship (1 time) – with Kareem Muhammad
NWA Southern Heavyweight Championship (Florida version) (1 time)
NWA United States Tag Team Championship (Florida version) (1 time) – with Kareem Muhammad
Continental Wrestling Association
AWA Southern Tag Team Championship (2 times) – with Kareem Muhammad
Mid-Atlantic Championship Wrestling
NWA Mid-Atlantic Television Championship (1 time)
Mid-South Wrestling
Mid-South Tag Team Championship (2 times) – with Ernie Ladd
UWF Tag Team Championship (1 time) – with Bill Irwin
NWA Big Time Wrestling
NWA Texas Tag Team Championship (1 time) – with Killer Tim Brooks
NWA Hollywood Wrestling
WA Americas Heavyweight Championship (1 time)
NWA Americas Tag Team Championship (1 time) – with Allen Coage
Pro Wrestling Illustrated
PWI ranked him # 484 of the 500 best singles wrestlers of the PWI Years in 2003.

See also
 List of premature professional wrestling deaths

References

1950 births
1988 deaths
20th-century American male actors
20th-century professional wrestlers
African-American male professional wrestlers
American male professional wrestlers
NWA/WCW World Television Champions
Professional wrestlers from Georgia (U.S. state)
Sportspeople from Savannah, Georgia
NWA Florida Global Tag Team Champions
NWA Southern Heavyweight Champions (Florida version)
NWA United States Tag Team Champions (Florida version)
NWA Americas Tag Team Champions
NWA Americas Heavyweight Champions